Dércio Gil (born 10 September 1938) is a Brazilian former footballer.

References

1938 births
Living people
Association football defenders
Brazilian footballers
Sociedade Esportiva Palmeiras players
Footballers at the 1960 Summer Olympics
Olympic footballers of Brazil